Princ Dobroshi (born 2 April 1964 in Peja, SR Serbia, SFR Yugoslavia) is a Kosovo Albanian crime boss, formerly active in Europe in the 1990s dealing with drug trafficking and arms smuggling to the Kosovo Liberation Army. As of 2006 he is living in Kosovo.

Crime career
In 1993 he was caught in Norway and in 1994 sentenced to 14 years in prison for heroin trafficking (other charges were pending in Sweden and Denmark). In a well coordinated operation he escaped from the Ullersmo prison in 1997. He moved to the Czech Republic where his group soon dominated in drug trafficking. On 23 February 1999 he was arrested in Prague.

On 6 September 2000 he was to be interrogated by the court at Ringerike District Jail, due to the high security aspect. The interrogations were canceled after the bus, carrying the court members, crashed with a truck, killing 3 of its members. 

The criminal underground had planned armed attack on the Pankrác Prison but in August 1999 Dobroshi was extradited to Norway to complete his sentence. He was paroled and deported for "good behavior" in January 2005. Then he returned into the Czech Republic and stayed there for three months, until his visa expired. Later, he returned to Peć, Kosovo.

He has admitted friendship with Arfan Qadeer Bhatti who was arrested in Norway on charges of planning to terrorize Israeli and American embassies in Oslo, Norway.

As of September 2006, he was living in Kosovo while his Albanian wife and their two children lived in Prague. An investigation of terror suspects in Norway in September 2006 discovered contacts between one of the suspects and Dobroshi (they met in Pristina in 2005). MF Dnes, a newspaper in the Czech Republic, speculated about possibility of Dobroshi taking revenge and organizing a terror attack in Prague. In an interview the next day, Dobroshi acknowledged he knew the person but denied any involvement.

References

External links
 Details about his arrest in Prague (in Czech, material of Ministry of Interior)
 Overview of Dobroshi's activities (scroll to section 3)

1964 births
Living people
People from Peja
Albanian gangsters
Kosovan gangsters
Crime bosses
Albanian escapees
Escapees from Norwegian detention
Albanian drug traffickers
Albanian expatriates in Norway
People extradited to Norway
People extradited from the Czech Republic
Albanian murderers